Complement component 6 is a protein that in humans is encoded by the C6 gene.

Complement component 6 is a protein involved in the complement system. It is part of the membrane attack complex which can insert into the cell membrane and cause the cell to lyse.

People with C6 deficiency are prone to bacterial infection.

References

Further reading

External links
 

Complement system